Skye Dolecki (born October 2, 1999) is an American professional wrestler. She is currently working for the American promotion All Elite Wrestling (AEW) under the ring name Skye Blue.

She has also appeared on NWA Powerrr and Warrior Wrestling.

Professional wrestling career 
Blue debuted in 2017, wrestling on the independent circuit in Illinois. She made her AEW Dark: Elevation debut on April 7, 2021, losing to Britt Baker. On September 3, she made her AEW Dark debut losing to Red Velvet. On September 5, she made her pay-per-view debut, competing in the Casino Battle Royale at All Out. On October 6, she debuted on AEW Rampage, losing to Jade Cargill. On January 19, 2022, Blue debuted on AEW Dynamite, losing to Serena Deeb. On the April 2 episode of AEW Rampage, Blue competed in the Owen Hart Foundation Women's Tournament, losing to Jamie Hayter in a qualifying match.

Championships and accomplishments 

Global Professional Wrestling
GPW Battle Royal Champion (1 time)
Chicago Style Wrestling
CSW Women's Championship (1 time)
Pro Wrestling ZERO1 USA 
ZERO1 USA Women's Championship (1 time)
AAW: Professional Wrestling Redefined
AAW Women's Championship (1 time)

References

External links 
 
 

21st-century professional wrestlers
American female professional wrestlers
Living people
Professional wrestlers from New York City
1999 births
All Elite Wrestling personnel